Riggs Flat Lake is a reservoir located near the top of the Pinaleño Mountains, in the Coronado National Forest and Graham County, Arizona.

Fish species
 Rainbow Trout
 Brown trout

References

External links
 Arizona Fishing Locations Map
 Arizona Boating Locations Facilities Map

Reservoirs in Graham County, Arizona
Pinaleño Mountains
Coronado National Forest
Reservoirs in Arizona